The 2013–14 Liga Premier de Ascenso season was split in two tournaments Apertura and Clausura. Liga Premier was the third-tier football league of Mexico. The season was played between 9 August 2013 and 17 May 2014.

Torneo Apertura

Changes from the previous season 
31 teams participated in this tournament.
Chivas Rayadas was moved to Tlaxcala and changed its name to Linces de Tlaxcala.
Querétaro "B" changed its name and venue to Irapuato.
Cimarrones de Sonora was created after the promotion and venue change of Poblado Miguel Alemán F.C.
Pumas Morelos, team relegated from Ascenso MX, was moved to Coatzacoalcos and changed its name to Atlético Coatzacoalcos.
Tecamachalco moved from Cuautitlán to Ciudad Nezahualcóyotl and changed its name to Teca UTN.
Real Saltillo Soccer was acquired by new owners, who moved it to Zacatecas and changed its name to Tuzos UAZ,

Group 1

Group 2 
{{Location map+ |Mexico |width=700|float=right |caption=Location of teams in the 2013–14 LPA Group 2 |places=

Regular season

Group 1

Standings 

Last updated on November 16, 2013.Source: SoccerWay

Results

Group 2

Standings

Last updated on November 16, 2013.Source: SoccerWay

Results

Regular season statistics

Top goalscorers 
Players sorted first by goals scored, then by last name.

Liguilla

Liguilla de Ascenso (Promotion Playoffs) 
The four best teams of each group play two games against each other on a home-and-away basis. The higher seeded teams play on their home field during the second leg. The winner of each match up is determined by aggregate score. In the quarterfinals and semifinals, if the two teams are tied on aggregate the higher seeded team advances. In the final, if the two teams are tied after both legs, the match goes to extra time and, if necessary, a penalty shoot-out.

(t.p.) The team was classified by its best position in the general table

Quarter-finals

First leg

Second leg

Semi-finals

First leg

Second leg

Final

First leg

Second leg

Liguilla de Copa 
The Copa de la Segunda División (Second Division Cup) was a tournament created for those teams that had no chance to play the Liguilla de Ascenso. In each of the leagues the regular season is disputed for each tournament, the first eight (four of each group) advance to their respective league to determine the champion of the league, the next four of each group accessed the cup liguilla. If a team had no right to promotion, or was a reserve could not play promotion playoffs, so if he was in higher positions directly access the Cup, and gave way to teams that could rise.

Torneo Clausura

Regular season

Group 1

Standings 

Last updated on April 19, 2014.Source: SoccerWay

Results

Group 2

Standings

Last updated on April 19, 2014.Source: SoccerWay

Results

Regular season statistics

Top goalscorers 
Players sorted first by goals scored, then by last name.

Liguilla

Liguilla de Ascenso (Promotion Playoffs) 
The four best teams of each group play two games against each other on a home-and-away basis. The higher seeded teams play on their home field during the second leg. The winner of each match up is determined by aggregate score. In the quarterfinals and semifinals, if the two teams are tied on aggregate the higher seeded team advances. In the final, if the two teams are tied after both legs, the match goes to extra time and, if necessary, a penalty shoot-out.

(t.p.) The team was classified by its best position in the general table

Quarter-finals

First leg

Second leg

Semi-finals

First leg

Second leg

Final

First leg

Second leg

Liguilla de Copa 
The Copa de la Segunda División (Second Division Cup) was a tournament created for those teams that had no chance to play the Liguilla de Ascenso. In each of the leagues the regular season is disputed for each tournament, the first eight (four of each group) advance to their respective league to determine the champion of the league, the next four of each group accessed the cup liguilla. If a team had no right to promotion, or was a reserve could not play promotion playoffs, so if he was in higher positions directly access the Cup, and gave way to teams that could rise.

(t.p.) The team was classified by its best position in the general table

Relegation Table 

Last updated: 19 April 2014 Source: Liga Premier FMFP = Position; G = Games played; Pts = Points; Pts/G = Ratio of points to games played

Promotion Final 
The Promotion Final is a series of matches played by the champions of the tournaments Apertura and Clausura, the game is played to determine the winning team of the promotion to Ascenso MX. 
The first leg was played on 14 May 2014, and the second leg was played on 17 May 2014.

First leg

Second leg

See also 
2013–14 Liga MX season
2013–14 Ascenso MX season
2013–14 Liga de Nuevos Talentos season

References

External links 
 Official website of Liga Premier
 Magazine page 

 
1